Vakfıkebir Arena is an indoor multi-purpose sports venue located in Vakfıkebir town of Trabzon Province, Turkey. The arena has a capacity of 10.787 spectators.

The arena hosted the Taekwonde events at the 2007 Black Sea Games and handball event for girls during the 2011 European Youth Summer Olympic Festival.

References

Sports venues in Trabzon
Handball venues in Turkey